The Sermon for Necessities (Arabic: Khutbat-ul-Haajah) is a popular sermon (khutbah) in the Islamic world (particularly as the introduction to a khutbah during Jumu'ah). It is used as an introduction to numerous undertakings of a Muslim.

History of the Sermon
The Sermon for Necessities was initially taught by Muhammad as part of the Sunnah. From Muhammad, the sermon has been reported by numerous Sahaba including: Abd Allah ibn Mas'ud, Abu Musa Ashaari, `Abd Allah ibn `Abbas, Jabir ibn Abd-Allah, Aisha and Sahl ibn Sa'd.
The use of the sermon had been neglected for some years until certain scholars such as Ahmad ibn Muhammad al-Tahawi, Ibn Taymiyyah, and Ibn Qayyim Al-Jawziyya and others revived it.

Text of the Sermon
The Sermon for Necessities is composed of the following text (i.e. the English translation of the original Arabic text) as taught by Muhammad, including Ayat (Verses) from three different Qur’anic Suras (Chapters):

After saying “To proceed,” the person then continues upon what they planned to say, write or do.

See also
Dua
Khutbah

References 

Salah
Islamic sermons
Salah terminology
7th-century speeches